The 2011 All-Ireland Senior Ladies' Football Championship was the 38th edition of the Ladies' Gaelic Football Association's premier inter-county Ladies' Gaelic football tournament. It was known for sponsorship reasons as the TG4 All-Ireland Senior Ladies' Football Championship.

 were the winners, defeating Monaghan in the final.

Structure
Sixteen teams compete.
The top four teams from 2010 receive byes to the quarter-finals.
The quarter-finalists from 2010 receive byes to the second round.
The other eight teams play in the first round.
All games are knockout matches, drawn games being replayed.
The first-round losers playoff, with one team being relegated to the intermediate championship for 2012. Teams must spend two years as a senior team before they are eligible for relegation; teams that have not done so are exempt from relegation.

Fixtures and results

Early stages

Final stages

References

!